Daniele Morato Moreno (born November 4, 1985), commonly known as Dani Moreno, is a Brazilian actress.

Career 
Born in São Paulo, Dani Moreno made her stage debut in 2005, being part of the cast for the play , by Oswaldo Montenegro.

In 2006, Moreno starred in the play . She later worked on several classic plays, such as Twelfth Night, Our Town and Three Sisters.

Moreno made her television debut in 2011, after being called to interpret the character Martha in the telenovela Amor e Revolução, for SBT.

In 2012, she was contracted by Rede Globo to be part of the cast of Salve Jorge, where she interpreted Aisha.

In 2015, she returned to SBT, for the role of Safira in Cúmplices de um Resgate, the novela's main villain.

Later, in 2019, she moved to RecordTV to work on the telenovela Amor sem Igual.

Personal life 
Moreno is a vegan, having swapped to the diet in 2019. Besides her acting career, she also works on campaigns for the  since 2020.

In 2021, Moreno was diagnosed with Ankylosing spondylitis. She revealed her diagnosis through an Instagram post.

Filmography

Television

Theater

Awards and nominations

References

External links 

 
 

Brazilian women singers
Singers from São Paulo
Actresses from São Paulo (state)
Brazilian television actresses
1985 births
Living people